Quíquel is a rural area in the Dalcahue commune, on Chiloé Island in the Los Lagos Region of Chile. The area is located about 7 km. north of the port town of Dalcahue. Its inhabitants work mainly in the salmon farming and seafood industry. The area is surrounded by native forests.

External links
 Dalcahue

References 

Chiloé Archipelago